Do No Harm is an American medical drama television series that aired on NBC from January 31 through September 7, 2013. The series follows Dr. Jason Cole as he balances working as a neurosurgeon with suppressing his evil alter ego, Ian Price.

Do No Harm is a modern take on Robert Louis Stevenson's classic 1886 novella Strange Case of Dr Jekyll and Mr Hyde. The series was panned by critics, and holds a 15% on Rotten Tomatoes.

The network placed a series order in May 2012. On November 12, 2012, NBC reduced its episode order for the series from 13 to 12 episodes, due to scheduling conflicts (13 episodes were produced and eventually aired).

On February 8, 2013, it was announced that NBC had cancelled the series after airing two episodes, due to low ratings. On April 26, 2013, NBC announced that the remaining episodes would be burned off, beginning June 29, 2013.

Cast and characters

Main cast
 Steven Pasquale as Dr. Jason Cole (chief of neurosurgery at Independence Memorial Hospital) and as Ian Price, his alternate personality
 Alana de la Garza as Dr. Lena Solis, a neurologist at IMH and Dr. Cole's love interest
 Ruta Gedmintas as Olivia Flynn, Dr. Cole's estranged former fiancé and the mother of his son, Cole
 Phylicia Rashad as Dr. Vanessa Young, chief of surgery at IMH
 Michael Esper as Dr. Kenneth Jordan, a neurosurgeon at IMH who is suspicious of Dr. Cole
 John Carroll Lynch as Will Hayes, a construction contractor and the leader of Dr. Cole's dissociative personality disorder support group

Recurring cast
 Lin-Manuel Miranda as Dr. Ruben Marcado, a clinical pharmacologist at IMH and Dr. Cole's friend
 Samm Levine as Josh Stern, Dr. Cole's administrative assistant
 Jeremy Davidson as Rob, another doctor at IMH and Lena's boyfriend
 Toni Trucks as Dr. Patricia Rivers
 James Cromwell as Dr. Phillip Carmelo
 Jurnee Smollett as Abby, Dr. Young's daughter who has just left drug rehab
 Brendan McHale as Cole Flynn, Jason/Ian and Olivia's son

Episodes

Reception
The series has received a 38 out of 100 on Metacritic, and 15% on Rotten Tomatoes. It also had the lowest-rated in-season scripted premiere ever on the four major broadcast networks.

The series was criticized for being far-fetched and having poor writing, although Steven Pasquale's performance as Jason Cole/Ian Price was praised.

Mary McNamara of the Los Angeles Times described the series "not so much a thrilling psychological drama as a mismatched roommate comedy. Oscar and Felix, if one of them was a doctor and they had to share the same body."

Entertainment Weekly wrote that "the Jekyll-and-Hyde medical drama...set a record as the lowest-rated in-season drama debut in modern history...and was axed after two episodes," the show being one of many that harmed NBC's winter line-up.

Streaming
All episodes are available from electronic sell-through platforms such as iTunes, Amazon Instant Video and Vudu.

References

External links
 
 

2010s American workplace drama television series
2010s American medical television series
2013 American television series debuts
2013 American television series endings
English-language television shows
NBC original programming
Television series by Universal Television
Television shows set in Philadelphia
Television series based on Strange Case of Dr Jekyll and Mr Hyde